Henry Staveley Staveley-Hill  (22 May 1865 – 25 March 1946) was a British barrister and Conservative Party politician.

The son of the Conservative politician Alexander Staveley Hill, Hill (who assumed by Royal Licence the name of Staveley in 1906) was educated at Westminster School and St John's College, Oxford, where he rowed for the college. He was called to the bar at the Inner Temple in 1891, and practiced on the Oxford circuit.

Following in the steps of his father, he became first Recorder of Banbury (1903–22) and Conservative Member of Parliament for Kingswinford (1905–18), after winning the 1905 Kingswinford by-election. During the First World War, Staveley-Hill commanded the 2/1st Staffordshire Yeomanry, with the rank of lieutenant-colonel, then became Superintending Officer, Labour Corps, Scottish Command.

Staveley-Hill was appointed a County Court judge in 1918. He resigned in 1928, after an order in bankruptcy had been made against him.

References

External links
 

UK MPs 1900–1906
1946 deaths
English barristers
20th-century English judges
People educated at Westminster School, London
Alumni of St John's College, Oxford
Members of the Middle Temple
Conservative Party (UK) MPs for English constituencies
Staffordshire Yeomanry officers
UK MPs 1906–1910
UK MPs 1910
UK MPs 1910–1918
English justices of the peace
Deputy Lieutenants of Staffordshire
Royal Pioneer Corps officers
British Army personnel of World War I
1865 births
County Court judges (England and Wales)